Albion House (also known as "30 James Street" or the White Star Building) is a Grade II* listed building located in Liverpool, England. It was constructed between 1896 and 1898 and is positioned on the corner of James Street and The Strand across from the Pier Head.


History
Designed by architects Richard Norman Shaw and J. Francis Doyle, it was built for the Ismay, Imrie and Company shipping company, which later became the White Star Line. After White Star merged with Royal Mail Line the headquarters remained at Albion House until 1934 at which time the British Government forced the merger of Cunard Line and White Star Line. The building is situated on the corner of The Strand and James Street. The facade is constructed from white Portland stone and red brick. In 1912, when news of the disaster of the Titanic reached the offices, the officials were too afraid to leave the building, and instead read the names of the deceased from the balcony. During World War II, the gable was damaged and was later rebuilt in the late 1940s.

After many years being vacant, in 2014 the building was converted into a Titanic-themed hotel known as 30 James Street.

Opened by Signature Living in 2014 the Grade II-listed 30 James Street Hotel, formerly the headquarters of Titanic owners White Star, now has a new operator.

On Jun 23, 2020 A new hotel operator is to take over the running of Liverpool's 30 James Street Hotel with original owner Signature Living now out of the picture.

However, in the last few weeks the hotel was placed in receivership and now receivers Julian Clarke and Matthew Nagle of Savills have announced that another operator, Legacy Hotels, will take over the business.

Legacy Hotels is already well known in the city, operating the Pullman Hotel on the waterfront and opening a Novotel at the new Paddington Village near the University of Liverpool. It currently operates a portfolio of hotels across the UK and Europe.

The new operators are seeking to preserve as many of existing jobs as possible despite what they describe as the “challenging” economic situation brought about by the UK's Covid-19 related lockdown

Architecture

The design closely follows the architect's earlier work of 1887, the former New Scotland Yard building in London. In the 1980s, the Offices in Albion House were noted for their exquisite Office desks of fine wood. The entrance to the building at James Street has a fine mosaic of South America set into the floor, also near the James Street entrance inside Albion House was a wooden war memorial listing the members of staff who "Gave their lives for their country" in the 1914-18 War.

Albion House is recorded in the National Heritage List for England as a designated Grade II* listed building.

See also
Grade II* listed buildings in Merseyside
Architecture of Liverpool

References

External links
 English Heritage National Monuments Register
 Image (p5), New Scotland Yard, for comparison

Grade II* listed buildings in Liverpool
Richard Norman Shaw buildings
Grade II* listed hotels